Anthony Amaral (19 August 19309 June 1982) was an American West Historian and horse trainer. He wrote books and articles on movie and feral horses, as well a biography of Western novelist and artist Will James.

Biography

Personal life
Amaral was born in New York, but moved to Carson City, Nevada at an early age. He served in the U.S. Army in the early 1950s during the Korean War, where he reached the rank of 1st Lieut. After his discharge, he attended California State Polytechnic University, Pomona then stayed on as a horse trainer at the W. K. Kellogg Arabian Horse Center.  His first known published article was about the Center.  He married Loretta Anne Richey in 1965 in Napa California; was later divorced in 1971, in Carson City, Nevada.

Death and afterward

Amaral died in 1982 "fighting down a stallion at the end of a rope".  His collections on Will James are now archived in the University of Nevada Reno Library.  The library also has a collection of his photographs.

Philosophical and/or political views
Amaral advocated non-abusive means for filming horse stunts in movies, and wrote several articles protesting the harassment of wild (feral) horses.

Published works

Corn Flake Legacy Horse Lovers Magazine April–May 1959 p. 32-33.

Motion picture horses. Cruse Publishing Co., [1962]
New Kellogg's Pony Breed by Anthony A. Amaral In Western Horseman, February 1962, pp. 74–77
Struggle in Owen's Valley American Forests Magazine August, 1964
The Flume Riders True West, April 1966, pp. 24–25
Movie horses: their treatment and training;  Bobbs-Merrill- (1967)
Movie Horses : The Fascinating Techniques of Training WILSHIRE BOOK COMPANY (1967)

Idah Meacham Strobridge, First Woman of Nevada Letters Nevada State Historical Society, Fall 1967.
A Dedication to the Memory of Will James 1892–1942; University of Arizona Press: Arizona and the West, Autumn, 1968 pp. 206–210
Wagons By Studebaker by Anthony A. Amaral In Old West, June 1968, pp. 56–61
Walter Van Tilburg Clark : the writer as teacher Sage. Vol. 2, no. 3 (Winter 1968) pp. 10–15.
The Wild Stallion: Comments on His Natural History; A. Amaral - Brand Book, 1969.
The Story of Frank Hopkins, Western Horseman Magazine, 1969
Movie Horses Old West, March 1970, pp. 6–21
The Wild Horse - Worth Saving? by Anthony Amaral  National Parks and Conservation, March, 1971 pp. 21–24
Threat to the Free Spirit:  The Question of the Mustang's Future The American West September 1971, pp. 13–17.
Lace curtains and Bootjacks, Old Carson City's Ormsby House [Carson City, Nev.] : Ormsby House, ©1972.
The Importance of Disposition by Anthony A. Amaral In Western Horseman, April, 1974
Quest for Arabian horses became a desert odyssey Smithsonian Magazine, September 1975 pp. 42–49

Statement by Anthony Amaral, Author and Librarian Proceedings National Wild Horse Forum April 4-7-1977 p. 66.
Selective Major Literature Relating to Wild Horses  Proceedings National Wild Horse Forum April 4-7-1977  pp. 68–9.
How to train your horse. A complete guide to making an honest horse. A. Amaral -  New York : Winchester Press, ©1977.
The West of Will James: A Portfolio of His Drawings; W James, A.A. Amaral - 1978 - University of Nevada Press
Spirit Horse Far West. Vol. 2, no. 2. 1979, pp. 24–41.

References

External links
 Anthony Amaral on Horse
 The Story of Frank Hopkins
 Zadar 8096

Historians of the American West
People from Carson City, Nevada
Writers from Nevada
California State Polytechnic University, Pomona alumni
1930 births
1982 deaths